Pammi Baweja also known as Paramjeet Baweja is an Indian film producer based in Mumbai, India. She is the wife of the Indian film director Harry Baweja. Harman Baweja, her son, debuted in the Love Story 2050.

Selected filmography

External links
 

Hindi-language film directors
Indian women film producers
Living people
Film producers from Mumbai
Year of birth missing (living people)